Way Back Home is a 2011 Filipino family drama film. The film was released by Star Cinema and premiered on August 17, 2011.

The film follows the story of two sisters, Ana Bartolome (Kathryn Bernardo) and Jessica Santiago (Julia Montes), who have been separated for twelve years and grew up in two totally different worlds.

Plot 
For 12 years, Jessica Santiagio (Julia Montes) has been dealing with the pain and guilt of losing her sister Joanna. Despite her efforts to please her mother Amy (Agot Isidro), Jessica knows that the emptiness in her mother's heart can only be filled by Joanna's return. Unbeknownst to the Santiagos, Joanna has lived to become Ana Bartolome (Kathryn Bernardo), the daughter of simple fisher folk (Lotlot De Leon). When Ana is finally found, she tries to reconnect with her family, especially with Jessica. But Ana's return worsens Jessica's feelings of abandonment. Jessica feels less loved by Amy while Ana feels like she has to win Jessica's approval. After growing tensions between the two sisters result in a competition that endangers the life of one, the family is forced to confront the possibility of being torn apart again.

Production
After the success of the television series, Mara Clara, ABS-CBN decided to launch the lead cast of the series to film, Bernardo and Montes. In February 2011, the cast was announced that the two main characters will be portrayed by Bernardo and Montes and supposedly together with AJ Perez and Albie Casiño. However, on April 17, 2011, Perez died due to a vehicular accident.

The film company then replaced Perez with Sam Concepcion. In June 2011, Casino was originally tied to the film. However, in July, he was pulled out and was replaced by Enrique Gil. According to Star Cinema, the change in the lineup is prompted by their desire to experiment with different combinations for Bernardo and Montes. Casino had initially worked with Bernardo and Montes in Mara Clara.

Cast and characters

Kathryn Bernardo as Ana Bartolome / Joanna Liezl Santiago
Julia Montes as Jessica Lorraine "Jessie" Santiago

Supporting cast
Enrique Gil as Michael Estacio
Sam Concepcion as Andrew Joseph “AJ” Delgado
Agot Isidro as Amelia "Amy" Santiago
Tonton Gutierrez as Ariel Santiago
Lotlot De Leon as Lerma Bartolome
Clarence Delgado as Buboy Bartolome
Bella Flores as Lola Nita
Ahron Villena as Jeffrey Santiago
Jairus Aquino as Junior Bartolome
Josh Ivan Morales as Uncle Dado
Gilleth Sandico as Aunt Tida
Mickey Ferriols as Bettina
Kyle Danielle Ocampo as Young Jessica Santiago
Veyda Inoval as Pochay
Veronica Louise Bernardo as Young Joanna Santiago
Cecil Paz as Yaya Minda
Earl Christian Periquet as Young Jeffrey Santiago
Ray An Dulay as Berto
Kristel Fulgar as Froggy/ Luisa Mariquit
Katrina "Hopia" Legaspi as Yvette

Reception

Launch
The official poster and promotional photos were released through Star Cinema's official Multiply site. The official cinematic trailer was released on the July 30 episode of the noontime variety show, Happy Yipee Yehey. It was first reported that the soundtrack of the film, "You're My Home" will be covered by Maria Aragon, but later on showed in the film's music video that Angeline Quinto will sing the theme song, which was originally sung by Odette Quesada.

Critical response
On a film review done by Noel Orsal of Philippine Entertainment Portal he quoted, "The typical Filipino film is at home in portraying families. It brings out one of the best dramatic scenes and emphatic dialogues primarily because relationships within the family can relate to. Conflicts and dysfunction between parent and child or among siblings would always find an audience connecting to a particular character over another."

Box office
The film opened at first place with an P18 million within its first week surpassing 50 First Dates and Blended in Philippine cinemas, according to Box Office Mojo. On its second week, the film grossed an estimated P4 million, having a total gross receipt of P25.7 million. The film was shown in theaters for only two weeks because of the new Star Cinema film Wedding Tayo, Wedding Hindi.

References

External links
 Way Back Home at the Internet Movie Database

Philippine drama films
2010s Tagalog-language films
Star Cinema films
2010s English-language films
Films directed by Jerry Lopez Sineneng